The Alsatian goose, is a breed of goose developed in the French region of Alsace. A small breed, this goose was developed to grow a large and fatty liver for foie gras production.

Uses
Geese selected for this purpose have shorter legs and wider bodies. This body form allows the development of internal organs, particularly the liver. Geese whose livers are not deemed usable for foie gras are slaughtered for their meat.

See also
 List of goose breeds

References

External links 
  French geese breeds

Goose breeds originating in France
Goose breeds